Bommalata, also known as A Belly Full of Dreams, is a 2004 Indian Telugu-language children's film written and directed by Prakash Kovelamudi. It is produced by K. Raghavendra Rao, Rana Daggubati and Gangaraju Gunnam under  R. K. Film Associates and Spirit Media. The film's  Puppetry work was done by Dadi Pudumjee, along with art direction by Bhupesh R Bhupathi. The film won the Best Film in Telugu at the 53rd National Awards. Sai Kumar won the National Film Award for Best Child Artist for the film.

Cast

Sai Kumar ... Child Artiste
Shiva... Child Artiste
Tanikella Bharani ... Tea Stall Owner
Viren Thambidorai... Tea Stall Customer
Shriya Saran ... Guest Appearance
Allari Naresh ... Guest Appearance

Plot 
This story is about a boy who has a burning desire to go to school. This character (acted by Sai Kumar) is really heart-touching. He did his best when it came to how he felt with his first friendship, how desperate is he to study, how daring he is and last, but not the least, his honesty.

Awards
National Film Award for Best Feature Film in Telugu
National Film Award for Best Child Artist 2005 - Sai Kumar

References

2000s Telugu-language films
2004 films
Best Telugu Feature Film National Film Award winners
Indian children's films
Indian avant-garde and experimental films
Films directed by Prakash Kovelamudi